Hossein Aryanejad (born 11 October 1958) is an Iranian chess player who holds the titles of FIDE Master and FIDE Trainer (2009). He won the Iranian Chess Championship in 1992 and 1995 and represented Iran in four Chess Olympiads.

References

External links
 
 
 
 

1958 births
Living people
Iranian chess players
Chess FIDE Masters